Eslamabad-e Qadim (also Romanized as Eslāmābād-e Qadīm) is a city in Eslamabad District of Parsabad County, Ardabil province, Iran. At the 2006 census, its population was 3,069 in 629 households, when it was a village in the former Qeshlaq-e Jonubi Rural District of the Central District. The following census in 2011 counted 3,349 people in 869 households. The latest census in 2016 showed a population of 3,068 people in 829 households, by which time the village had become a city in the newly established Eslamabad District.

References 

Parsabad County

Cities in Ardabil Province

Towns and villages in Parsabad County

Populated places in Ardabil Province

Populated places in Parsabad County